The 1998–99 season was Kilmarnock's first season in the newly formed Scottish Premier League. They also competed in the Scottish Cup, Scottish League Cup and UEFA Cup.

Summary

Season
Kilmarnock finished fourth in the Scottish Premier League with 56 points. They reached the fourth round of the League Cup, losing to Airdrieonians. Kilmarnock also reached the third round of the Scottish Cup, losing to rivals Ayr United and lost in the second qualifying round of the UEFA Cup to Sigma Olomouc.

Results and fixtures

Kilmarnock's score comes first

Scottish Premier League

UEFA Cup

Scottish League Cup

Scottish Cup

Squad statistics

|}

Final league table

Division summary

Transfers

Players in

Players out

References

External links
 Kilmarnock 1998–99 at Soccerbase.com (select relevant season from dropdown list)

Kilmarnock F.C. seasons
Kilmarnock